Margaret Thomas-Neale (born 22 August 1931) is a British gymnast. She competed at the 1952 Summer Olympics and the 1960 Summer Olympics.

References

1931 births
Living people
British female artistic gymnasts
Olympic gymnasts of Great Britain
Gymnasts at the 1952 Summer Olympics
Gymnasts at the 1960 Summer Olympics
Sportspeople from Cardiff